Horace Walrond (born 22 September 1971) is a Barbadian cricketer. He played in fourteen first-class and fourteen List A matches for the Barbados cricket team from 1992 to 2000. He also represented Barbados in the cricket tournament at the 1998 Commonwealth Games.

See also
 List of Barbadian representative cricketers

References

External links
 

1971 births
Living people
Barbadian cricketers
Barbados cricketers
Cricketers at the 1998 Commonwealth Games
Commonwealth Games competitors for Barbados